Park Jong-il (born 1972) is a South Korean ski mountaineer and mountaineer.

Selected results 
 2009:
 3rd: Asian Championship, relay (mixed teams), together with Gwak Mi-hee
 6th: Asian Championship, vertical race
 2010
 2nd: Gangwong Provincial Governor Cup of Ski Mountaineering, individual
 2012:
 2nd: Asian Championship, individual
 2013
 2nd: Asian Cup Ski Mountaineering Competition, individual
 2015
 3rd: Asian Cup & Gangwon Provincial Governor Cup & Korea Championship, individual

Mountaineering 
 2006 Mont Blanc ascent
 2006 North Face of the Eiger ascent
 2006 Grandes Jorasses ascent
 2011 Moonflower Buttress of Mount Hunter first Korean ascent 
 2012 Mount Frances, Mount Hunter, Mount Mckinley ascent

References

External links 
 Park Jong-il, skimountaineering.org

1972 births
Living people
South Korean male ski mountaineers